Chikkodi Lok Sabha constituency is one of the 28 Lok Sabha constituencies in Karnataka in southern India.
It's constituency number is 1 in the list of Lok Sabha constituencies of Karnataka.

Assembly segments
Presently, Chikkodi Lok Sabha constituency comprises the following eight Legislative Assembly segments:

Members of Parliament

Election results

General Election 2019

General Election 2014

General Election 2009

General Election 2004

See also
 Belgaum North Lok Sabha constituency
 Belgaum South Lok Sabha constituency
 Belgaum district
 List of Constituencies of the Lok Sabha

References

Lok Sabha constituencies in Karnataka
Belagavi district